Glengyle Station most commonly known as Glengyle is a pastoral lease that operates as a cattle station in central west Queensland.

Description

The property is currently owned by S.Kidman & Co. Ltd. It is the site of the monument, Sidney Kidman's Tree of Knowledge, the coolibah tree which Kidman camped under when contemplating the development of his pastoral empire. Glengyle and other leases in the channel country, he realised, would be important acquisitions to link his properties in the Northern Territory to markets further south while still providing feed and water.

The Georgina River and other tributaries such as Eyre Creek run through the middle of the property and mostly carries water down from the north during the wet season. Further downstream lies Lake Machattie which also usually fills then the floodwaters spread out across the maze of lignum lines black soil channels. About one third of the property is flood plain which with adequate water is well vegetated by Cooper clover in winter and native sorghum in summer, another third is sandhill country with the remaining third made up of gibber plain that supports Mitchell grass following summer rains.

History
The station was established in 1876 by Duncan Macgregor one of the first in the region along with Annandale, Kaliduwarry, and Sandringham Stations. Macgregor held on to the property for the next 20 years and also acquired nearby Cacory Station.

William Buchanan acquired the  station in 1907. He intended to stock up from his Wave Hill Station in the Northern Territory, 4,000 head of cattle were immediately dispatched with Glengyle to be in good condition with plenty of feed and water.

The property was sold the trustees of the Buchanan Estate in 1912 to Sidney Kidman.

Between 1914 and 1916 the area was struck by drought, about 10,000 cattle died on the station during this time. Kidman lost over 75,000 head of stock on all of his properties through the channel country including Diamantina Lakes, Durham Downs, Innamincka and Sandringham Stations. Suffering financially, Kidman sold the property in 1918.

The property was carrying 25,000 head of cattle and 1,000 horses.

Airmail delivery to remote properties in outback South Australia, New South Wales and Queensland commenced in 1949. Glengyle along with other remote properties including Mungerannie, Clifton Hills, Mulka, Davenport Downs, Morney Plains, Mount Leonard, Durrie, Cordillo Downs, Tanbar, Durham Downs, Nappa Merrie, Lake Pure and Naryilco were also on the route.

The Georgina River flooded in 1950 and again in 1953 following heavy rain events further north. The 1953 flood was  higher at Glengyle compared to the 1950 event. The Diamantina River was also in flood and the waters were expected to make it to Lake Eyre.

Glengyle is the end of the world's longest mail run that is about a  round trip. The run starts at Port Augusta and finishes at Glengyle an includes other properties such as Anna Creek and Durrie Stations.

The station, and much of the channel country, resembled an inland sea in March 2011 when flood waters flowed down from the north following Cyclone Yasi.

In 2013, the station was struck by drought again requiring water to be piped , at a cost of A$100,000, from a bore to the homestead once the water in the dams had run dry.

See also
List of ranches and stations

References

Stations (Australian agriculture)
Pastoral leases in Queensland
Central West Queensland
1876 establishments in Australia